The Mpanga-Kipengere Game Reserve is a protected area in Njombe Region of the Southern Highlands of Tanzania, East Africa. In addition to the preservation of wildlife the reserve is an important catchment for the headwaters of several rivers that feed into the Great Ruaha River and provide water for the Usangu wetlands.

Since 2005, the protected area is considered a Lion Conservation Unit.

This reserve is famous by its unique flora and fauna, scenic beauty, cultural heritage in Nyumba Nitu forest and Kimani waterfalls which are very attractive for nature tourism. Endemic species found in Mpanga – Kipengere Game Reserve are Nosed chameleon, marsh widow, Njombe cisticola and Kipengere seedeater, while the rare Fufumka bird has been recorded to live in the reserve.

Here more than 17 types of forests can be found, where a great amount of rare birds and butterflies are observed.

Geography
The Mpanga-Kipengere Game Reserve is located at the northern end of the Kipengere Range (Livingstone mountain range).  It lies partly in Makete District and partly in Wanging'ombe District. Tributaries of the Great Ruaha River that originate there include the Mbarali, Mlomboji, Kimani and Ipera rivers, all of which flow basically northwards.

Notes

Eastern miombo woodlands
Geography of Njombe Region
Protected areas of Tanzania
Southern Highlands, Tanzania
Southern Rift montane forest–grassland mosaic